They Call Me Baba Booey is an autobiography by radio producer Gary Dell'Abate with Chad Millman. In December 2010, InfoMania interviewed Dell'Abate about the book. Published by Villard, an imprint of Random House, the book was released on November 2, 2010.

Release
On April 28, 2010, the day of the book's announcement, about 20,000 words had been compiled. Dell'Abate reportedly signed a six-figure deal with Random House for his memoirs. In early 2019, Howard Stern and his staff determined that the book's lists still hold up.

References

External links
 They Call Me Baba Booey at Random House
 Gary Dell'Abate Official Website
 The Howard Stern Show at Sirius XM Radio

2010 non-fiction books
Collaborative non-fiction books
Show business memoirs